Owchghaz-e Sofla (also Romanized as Owchghāz-e Soflá; also known as Jigas, Nizhnyaya Dzhigas, Owjīqāz-e Pā’īn, Owjqāz-e Pā’īn, Srednyaya Dzhigas, Ūchqāz, Ūchqāz-e Pā’īn, Ūjeghāz-e Soflá, Ūjgāz Pā’īn, Ūjqāz, Ūjqāz-e Pā’īn, Ūjqāz-e Soflá, Ūjqāz-e Vasaţ, Ūjqāz Pā’īn, and Yūjqāz-e Pā’īn) is a village in Sanjabad-e Sharqi Rural District, in the Central District of Khalkhal County, Ardabil Proviance, Iran. At the 2006 census, its population was 67, in 9 families.

References 

Towns and villages in Khalkhal County